The Ven John Malcolm Nicholson (26 May 1908 – 2 December 1983)  was the Archdeacon of Doncaster from 1955 to 1959.

He was educated at  Whitgift School and King's College, Cambridge. After a period of study at Ripon College Cuddesdon  He was ordained Deacon in 1932 and Priest in 1933. After a curacy at St John the Baptist, Newcastle upon Tyne he held incumbencies at Monkseaton, Denton Burn, Cullercoats and High Melton. He was Headmaster of The King's School, Tynemouth from 1959 to 1970.

References

1908 births
People educated at Whitgift School
Alumni of King's College, Cambridge
Alumni of Ripon College Cuddesdon
Archdeacons of Doncaster
1983 deaths